Sartwellia is a genus of North American flowering plants in the tribe Tageteae within the family Asteraceae. The common name is glowwort. The genus was named for American botanist Henry Parker Sartwell.

Species 
The following species are recognised:
Sartwellia flaveriae A.Gray  - Chihuahua, New Mexico, western Texas
 Sartwellia gypsophila A.M.Powell & B.L.Turner   - Chihuahua
 Sartwellia humilis I.M.Johnst.  - Coahuila, Zacatecas, San Luis Potosí
 Sartwellia mexicana A.Gray - Coahuila, Chihuahua, Nuevo León, San Luis Potosí, Sonora

References

Flora of North America
Asteraceae genera
Tageteae